Spinops is an extinct genus of centrosaurine ceratopsian dinosaur from the Late Cretaceous of Alberta, southern Canada.

Discovery and naming
 
Spinops is known from the holotype NHMUK R16307, a partial parietal bone, preserving most of the midline bar. Referred material include NHMUK R16308, a partial parietal bone, partial dentary and unidentifiable limb fragments, NHMUK R16306, an incomplete skull, preserving only the dorsal portion of the skull, and NHMUK R16309, a partial right squamosal. None of this material was found in articulation, however it was all closely associated in the same bone bed, in the northwestern region ("Steveville Badlands") of the Dinosaur Provincial Park. Fossils of Spinops were first found in 1916, and were housed in the Natural History Museum in London. The material was not described until 2011, when the new species Spinops sternbergorum was erected. The material was probably collected from the upper part of the Oldman Formation or the lower part of the Dinosaur Park Formation, dating to the Campanian stage of the Late Cretaceous period.

Two partials skulls of Spinops were found in 1916, in a large bone bed near the Red Deer River of southern Alberta, by American commercial fossil collector Charles Hazelius Sternberg and his son Levi Sternberg. The fossils were sent to the Natural History Museum in London (then called the British Museum (Natural History)), which had financed the expedition. The museum considered the fossils too fragmentary to display, leaving them unprepared in the collections. In a letter to Charles H. Sternberg, English paleontologist Arthur Smith Woodward of the British Museum called the Spinops material "nothing but rubbish". The precise whereabouts of the bonebed that yielded the fossils is unknown due to poor field record keeping, but Darren Tanke of the Royal Tyrrell Museum is spearheading attempts at its relocation. The fossils were re-examined in 2011 by a team led by Dr Andrew A. Farke; which realized that the fossils represented an entirely new species of dinosaur.

Spinops was first named by Andrew A. Farke, Michael J. Ryan, Paul M. Barrett, Darren H. Tanke, Dennis R. Braman, Mark A. Loewen, and Mark R. Graham in 2011; the type species is Spinops sternbergorum. The generic name is derived from Latin spina, "spine", and Greek ops, "face", in reference to the unique ornamentation on the face. The specific name honours Charles H. and Levi Sternberg.

Classification
 
 
The cladogram presented below follows a recent phylogenetic analysis by Chiba et al. (2017):

See also
 Timeline of ceratopsian research

References

Centrosaurines
Late Cretaceous dinosaurs of North America
Fossil taxa described in 2011
Paleontology in Alberta
Campanian genus first appearances
Campanian genus extinctions
Ornithischian genera